Westlake Boys High School is a state secondary school for boys located in Forrest Hill, Auckland, New Zealand. The school opened in 1962, when Westlake High School (opened 1958) split into Westlake Girls High School on the existing site and Westlake Boys High School on a new site.

Westlake Boys considers itself to follow a 'traditional but progressive' model similar to that in operation at Auckland Grammar School.

Westlake Boys now features recently constructed facilities, including a new administration block, student services centre, and large auditorium capable of holding all of the school's students and staff simultaneously.

Westlake Boys Deputy headmaster David Ferguson took on the role of Headmaster of Westlake Boys High School, taking over from Craig Monaghan, a former Commonwealth Games Judo representative and referee.

Westlake Boys introduced a house system at the end of 2007 where each individual belongs to one of six houses: Pupuke, Ururoto, Hood, Smale, Murchison and Stanley.

Westlake Boys and Girls
Physically a few hundred metres apart, Westlake Girls and Westlake Boys engage in a joint annual theatrical production, participate in several joint musical ensembles (including a joint choir, two orchestras, a concert band and a jazz band), and some social dances, among other things. The two schools share a motto – "Virtute Experiamur" – "Let Courage Be Thy Test" in Latin.

Academic pathways
Westlake Boys High School uses the National Certificate of Educational Achievement to assess students. Until 2019, it also offered Cambridge Assessment International Education as an option, but this was phased out from 2016.

Sporting
Westlake Boys High School has built a tradition of sporting achievement throughout Auckland and New Zealand. The school's teams compete in all Auckland and North Harbour inter-secondary school competitions leading to regional, national and international championships.  In 2008/09, Westlake came second in both the Gillette and Maadi Cups in 2009, in both cases, losing to Hamilton Boys'.

Music and performing arts
The teaching of Performing Arts within the school is assisted by the newly constructed auditorium and administration complex. The educational music programme covers performance, composition, analysis, history and aural skills. Along with the option of taking music as a subject, there is also a compulsory Year 9 course, focusing on the appreciation of music and drama in everyday life through theoretical and practical exercises, which runs for multiple weeks throughout the year.

The school has a number of performing groups: a choir ('Voicemale'), a Barbershop Chorus ('Virtutti'), a Concert Band, Stage Band, and Junior Symphonic band. Orchestral groups include the Westlake Symphony, Chamber Orchestra the junior Taharoto Orchestra and the boys' string groups Conchordia and Camerata. The performing groups regularly win awards at the annual KBB Music Festival (formerly the Auckland Secondary Schools Band and Orchestra Festival or 'ASSBOF'). Some groups, such as the Choralation Choir, which won the platinum award at the Big Sing Finale in 2009, 2010, and 2011 are combined with Westlake Girls High School.

The school also holds (mostly annual) drama productions. Recent productions have included Oliver!, Guys & Dolls, School of Rock, Wind in the Willows, Once on Chunuk Bair, Footloose, Romeo and Juliet, Joseph and the Amazing Technicolor Dreamcoat, Little Shop of Horrors, A Midsummer Night's Dream and The Government Inspector.

Houses
The houses of Westlake Boys are:

Notable alumni

 Charles R. Alcock – astronomer, director of the Harvard-Smithsonian Center for Astrophysics

Politics
John Watson – Auckland Councillor, former local board member and former Head Boy.

The Arts
 Martin Henderson – film, TV and theatre actor
 Don McGlashan – musician, The Mutton Birds and Blam Blam Blam
 Tim Mahon and Mark Bell – founding members of Blam Blam Blam

Business
 A. J. Hackett – popularised bungee jumping
 John Hood – Rhodes Scholar, former CEO of Fletcher Challenge, former Vice-Chancellor of the University of Auckland and of Oxford University

Journalism
 Duncan Garner – television journalist

Environment 

 Winston Cowie

Sport

Basketball
 Thomas Abercrombie
 Jarrod Kenny
 Kirk Penney
 Corey Webster
 Tai Webster
 Robert Loe
 Jack Salt
 Yanni Wetzell

Cricket
 Andre Adams – former Black Cap
 Billy Bowden – ICC cricket umpire
 Paul Hitchcock – former Black Cap
 Justin Vaughan – former Black Cap, CEO New Zealand Cricket
 Lou Vincent – former Black Cap (National Cricket Team)
 Willie Watson – former NZ cricketer

Football
 Neil Jones – former All White
 Tommy Smith – footballer, All Whites
 Robert Ironside – former captain All White

Rowing
 Barrie Mabbott – Olympic Bronze medallist rower
 Mike Stanley – 1984 Olympic rower
 Eric Verdonk – Olympic Bronze medallist rower
Andy Hay – 1984 Olympic coxswain
Michael Brake - 2021 Olympic Gold medallist

Rugby League
 Frano Botica – former All Black and Kiwi
 Taniela Tuiaki - former Kiwi and West Tigers

Rugby union
 Nick Evans – former All Black
 Mike Harris – current Wallaby
 Luke McAlister – former All Black
 Dillon Hunt – current All Black
 Ron Williams – former All Black
 Wayne Pivac – current Wales national rugby union team coach

Sailing
 Tom Ashley – Olympic Gold medalist board sailor
 Dean Barker – a skipper of Team New Zealand, has participated in America's Cup and Louis Vuitton Cup as well as representing New Zealand at Olympics
 Hamish Pepper – Navigator of Team New Zealand, has participated in America's Cup 2003 as well as representing New Zealand at Olympics in 1996, 2004, 2008 & 2012
 Chris Dickson – former helmsman of BMW Oracle Racing and had participated in Louis Vuitton Cup

Shooting
 Malcolm Cooper – double Olympic Gold Medallist and founder of weapons manufacturing company Accuracy International, makers of the Arctic Warfare Magnum rifle

References

Boys' schools in New Zealand
Educational institutions established in 1962
Secondary schools in Auckland
North Shore, New Zealand
New Zealand secondary schools of Nelson plan construction
1962 establishments in New Zealand